Amara avida is a species of beetle of the genus Amara in the family Carabidae.

References

avida
Beetles described in 1823